Roman Kapranov (born 7 November 1983) is a Paralympian athlete from Russia competing mainly in category T37 sprint events. Kapranov competed for his country at the 2012 Summer Paralympics in London, where he won two medals, including a gold in the 100 metre sprint. He has also competed at two World Championships winning three medals.

Notes

Paralympic athletes of Russia
Athletes (track and field) at the 2012 Summer Paralympics
Paralympic gold medalists for Russia
Paralympic bronze medalists for Russia
1983 births
Living people
Russian male sprinters
People from Dzerzhinsk, Russia
Medalists at the 2012 Summer Paralympics
Medalists at the World Para Athletics Championships
Medalists at the World Para Athletics European Championships
Paralympic medalists in athletics (track and field)
Sportspeople from Nizhny Novgorod Oblast